Windhill is a hamlet in Ross and Cromarty, in the Highland council area of Scotland.

Windhill may also refer to:

Windhill, West Yorkshire, in Bradford, West Yorkshire, England
Windhill, Staincross, in Barnsley, South Yorkshire, England
Windhill, Mexborough, in Doncaster, South Yorkshire, England

See also 
Wind Hill
Windhill Green